Menegazzia efflorescens is a species of foliose lichen in the family Parmeliaceae. Described as new to science in 2001, it is found in Papua New Guinea.

See also
List of Menegazzia species

References

efflorescens
Lichen species
Lichens described in 2001
Lichens of New Guinea
Taxa named by Peter Wilfred James
Taxa named by André Aptroot
Taxa named by Emmanuël Sérusiaux